Zoltán Tóth (born 12 July 1983 in Szekszárd) is a Hungarian football player who currently plays for Kozármisleny SE.

References
Profile at HLSZ

1983 births
Living people
People from Szekszárd
Hungarian footballers
Association football midfielders
Kozármisleny SE footballers
Pécsi MFC players
Sportspeople from Tolna County